Leopold Grimme (5 June 1916 – 4 March 1988) was an Austrian footballer. He played in one match for the Austria national football team in 1946.

References

External links
 

1916 births
1988 deaths
Austrian footballers
Austria international footballers
Place of birth missing
Association footballers not categorized by position